Veronika Beatrice Wallin (born 5 April 1999) is a Swedish professional golfer. She won the 2016 Annika Invitational Europe and won the European Ladies' Team Championship in 2018, 2019 and 2020.

Early life and amateur career
Before focusing on golf Wallin was a swimmer, inspired by her father Christer Wallin who represented Sweden in the 1988, 1992 and 1996 Summer Olympics, winning silver medals in Barcelona (1992) and Atlanta (1996).

Wallin joined the National Team in 2016 and was part of a golden era of Swedish success in European team championships. Her teams, which often included Linn Grant, Frida Kinhult, Amanda Linnér, Ingrid Lindblad and Maja Stark, was runner-up at the 2016 European Girls' Team Championship and won in 2017. They then went on to win the European Ladies' Team Championship in 2018, 2019 and 2020, and finished runner-up in 2021. She is attached to Hills Golf Club in Mölndal, close to Gothenburg, Sweden.

Wallin represented Sweden at the 2017 World Junior Girls Championship in Canada, and at The Spirit International Amateur Golf Championship in 2019 with Maja Stark.

Individually, Wallin finished 4th at the 2015 Annika Invitational Europe and won the event in 2016, which helped her qualify for the European teams at the 2016 Junior Ryder Cup and the 2017 Junior Solheim Cup. She was runner-up at the 2016 French International Ladies Amateur Championship (Trophée Cecile de Rothschild) and the 2017 French International Lady Juniors Amateur Championship (Trophée Esmond), and 3rd at the 2017 Portuguese Ladies Amateur.
 
Wallin accepted a golf scholarship to Florida State University and started playing with the Florida State Seminoles women's golf team in the fall of 2018. In 2021, she won two tournaments and was named Atlantic Coast Conference Golfer of the Year. In 2022, she became the first player in FSU women's golf history to win an NCAA regional outright, shooting 6-under par over the three-round event to beat Florida Atlantic's Letizia Bagnoli by one stroke. She became just the second four-time All-American in school history, after earning All-American Mention honors in 2019 and 2020, and All-American First-Team honors in 2021 and 2022.

Wallin played in the inaugural Augusta National Women's Amateur in 2019, finishing 7th, and finished 10th at the 2021 installment, 3 strokes behind winner Tsubasa Kajitani of Japan. In 2022, she finished tied 4th, two strokes behind winner Anna Davis.

In the summer of 2020, Wallin was runner-up in three professional tournaments on the 2020 Swedish Golf Tour, the GolfUppsala Open and the Didriksons Skaftö Open behind Ingrid Lindblad, and the Golfhäftet Masters behind Linn Grant. 

She was invited to play in the 2020 U.S. Women's Open by virtue of her World Amateur Golf Ranking, which peaked at 4th.

Wallin played in the 2021 Arnold Palmer Cup with a 3–1 individual record. She finished 4th at the 2021 European Ladies Amateur, and finished 5th at the 2021 Didriksons Skaftö Open, a Ladies European Tour event.

Professional career
Wallin finished the eight-round 2021 LPGA Tour Q-Series tied at 60th, five shots short of a full LPGA card, but with Epson Tour status. She waited until after her graduation at the end of the 2022 spring semester to turn professional.

Amateur wins
2011 Skandia Tour Regional #4, Skandia Tour Regional #5, Skandia Cup Riksfinal F13
2012 Skandia Tour Regional #1, Skandia Cup Riksfinal F13
2013 Innesvingen Junior Open, Chalmers Junior Open, Skandia Tour Riks #6
2014 Sötenäs Junior Open, Torslanda Junior Open
2015 Skandia Tour Elit #1
2016 Annika Invitational Europe
2021 Florida State Match Up, Pinetree Women's Collegiate
2022 NCAA Tallahassee Regional

Sources:

Results in LPGA majors

CUT = missed the half-way cut
T = tied

Team appearances
Amateur
European Girls' Team Championship (representing Sweden): 2015, 2016, 2017 (winners)
European Ladies' Team Championship (representing Sweden): 2018 (winners), 2019 (winners), 2020 (winners), 2021
Junior Ryder Cup (representing Europe): 2016
Junior Solheim Cup (representing Europe): 2017
World Junior Girls Championship (representing Sweden): 2017
Espirito Santo Trophy (representing Sweden): 2018
The Spirit International Amateur Golf Championship (representing Sweden): 2019
Arnold Palmer Cup (representing the International Team): 2021

Source:

References

External links

Beatrice Wallin at the Florida State Seminoles official site

Swedish female golfers
Florida State Seminoles women's golfers
Sportspeople from Gothenburg
1999 births
Living people